 

The  (French), Emvod Ar Gelted An Oriant (Breton) or Inter-Celtic Festival of Lorient in English, is an annual Celtic festival, located in the city of Lorient, Brittany, France.

This annual festival takes place in the heart of the city every August and is dedicated to the cultural traditions of the Celtic nations (pays celtes in French), highlighting Celtic music and dance and also including other arts such as painting, photography, theatre, sculpture, traditional artisanry as well as sport and gastronomy.

Participants come from Brittany, Ireland, Scotland, Cornwall, Wales, Cumbria, the Isle of Man, Cape Breton Island, Galicia, Asturias, Acadia, and the entire Celtic diaspora.

Programme of events
The main festival sites are located throughout the city, with more formal events taking place at the Palais des Congrès, Grand Théâtre or Église Saint Louis. The larger events take place at the Parc du Moustoir (the home of Lorient Football Club which can hold up to  spectators), the Port de Pêche or in grand marquees.

On Sunday morning the Grand Parade of Celtic Nations takes place with over  musicians, singers, pipebands and dancers from all over the Celtic world parading through the city streets in national costume.

The finals of the National Bagadoù Championship takes place at the Parc de Moustoir during the first weekend of the festival. In addition individual competitions take place for pipers.

Master classes take place each morning. Afternoon events include folk and traditional music concerts and dance displays. Evening events include orchestral concerts, rock concerts and "Nuits Magiques", displays of pipe bands, dancers, choirs and fireworks.

Throughout the festival the "Village Celtique" (fr) or "Marc'had Etrekeltiek" (br) is open in the centre of the city offering food, music and literature, clothing and crafts.

On the final Saturday of the festival folk and rock musicians perform at the fishing harbour for the Nuit de Port de Pêche.

There is also much activity on the festival fringe, with musicians giving free performances in many of the city’s bars and pubs every evening until late.

The festival organisers have more recently embarked on similar ventures such as the St Patrick's Day concert in Paris, France, which attracts a crowd of  spectators and the Celtica concert in Nantes, Brittany.

See also
List of Celtic festivals
Kernewek Lowender – the world's largest Cornish festival

External links

 
 St Patrick's Night in Paris
 Celtica at Nantes

Breton festivals
Celtic music festivals
Inter-Celtic organisations
Lorient
Tourist attractions in Brittany
Music festivals in France
Tourist attractions in Morbihan
Piping events
Music festivals established in 1970